Evans Peak is a prominent rock peak,  high, standing  east-northeast of Mount Ostenso in the Sentinel Range of the Ellsworth Mountains, Antarctica. It overlooks Rumyana Glacier to the north and Patton Glacier to the south. The peak was named by the University of Minnesota Geological Party to these mountains, 1963–64, for John Evans, a geologist with the party.

See also
 Mountains in Antarctica

Maps
 Vinson Massif.  Scale 1:250 000 topographic map.  Reston, Virginia: US Geological Survey, 1988.
 Antarctic Digital Database (ADD). Scale 1:250000 topographic map of Antarctica. Scientific Committee on Antarctic Research (SCAR). Since 1993, regularly updated.

References

External links
 SCAR Composite Antarctic Gazetteer

Ellsworth Mountains
Mountains of Ellsworth Land